A Tale of Two Cities is a British television series which first aired on BBC 1 in 1965. It is an adaptation of the novel A Tale of Two Cities by Charles Dickens. Out of the 10 episodes produced, 8 are believed to be lost. Episodes 2 and 3 survive, and various promotional photographs and productions stills featuring the actors in costume are available online.

Cast
 Patrick Troughton as Dr. Manette
 Nicholas Pennell as Charles Darnay
 Kika Markham as Lucie Manette
 Leslie French as  Jarvis Lorry
 George Selway as Defarge
 John Wood as Sydney Carton
 Rosalie Crutchley as  Madame Defarge
 Ronnie Barker as Jerry Cruncher
 Alison Leggatt as  Miss Pross
 George Little as  Jacques Three
 Jack May as Mr. Stryver
 Peter Bayliss as Barsad
 Diana King as Vengeance
 Artro Morris as Jacques Two
 Stephen Dartnell as Jacques One
 Rolf Lefebvre as  Gabelle
 Ralph Nossek as Road-mender 
 Darryl Read as Jerry Cruncher Jr.
 Nicholas Smith as  Cly
 Jerome Willis as  Marquis St. Evrémonde
 Janet Henfrey as  Mrs. Cruncher
 Bernard Kay as President of Tribunal

Earlier versions
The BBC previously adapted A Tale of Two Cities as an eight-part serial in 1957, broadcast live from 28 July to 15 September. No recordings or photographs of the production are known to exist, leaving all audio and visual record of it completely lost.

Another two hour film version was produced by the BBC a year later, broadcast on 10 October 1958. This television film, performed live, exists as a 35mm telerecording, but it has not been repeated or made available publicly since its original broadcast.

References

Bibliography
Ellen Baskin. Serials on British Television, 1950-1994. Scolar Press, 1996.

External links
 

BBC television dramas
1965 British television series debuts
1965 British television series endings
1960s British drama television series
1960s British television miniseries
English-language television shows
Television series set in the 18th century
Television shows based on works by Charles Dickens
Works based on A Tale of Two Cities